Bear Island Lake is a lake which is about  southwest of Ely in the U.S. state of Minnesota. There are at least 20 other islands in the lake. The shoreline of the natural glacial lake is about two-thirds state and national forest, including Bear Island State Forest. While deep in parts, several shallow bays and natural sand beaches make it a popular swimming spot.

Fishing
The lake is a naturally self-sustaining lake and includes a large variety of fish, such as walleye, northern pike, smallmouth bass, largemouth bass, crappie, bluegill, sunfish, pumpkinseed and perch. The major inlet for Bear Island Lake is the Beaver River, which has rapids and beaver dams that limit fish movement. The lake's major outlet is Bear Island River, which has an old dam that also limits fish movement at low water.

Skiing
The Bear Island Ski Trail contains  of groomed cross country trails. This two-section trail system winds through Superior National Forest, with a picnic rock along the trail to Perch Lake, and another section that follows the shoreline of Bear Island Lake.

Other places
Another nearby lake is called Bear Head Lake and is part of Bear Head Lake State Park, along with Big Island, which is in nearby Eagles Nest Lake, which is actually three separate lakes named No. 1, No. 2 and No. 3. Farther north, along the Canada–US border, is Round Bear Island, which is in Kabetogama Lake and is part of Voyageurs National Park.

See also
List of lakes in Minnesota
List of islands in the United States

External links 
Minnesota Department of Natural Resources: Topographical Map of Bear Island and Bear Island Lake
Minnesota Department of Natural Resources: Bear Island Lake

Lakes of Minnesota
Bodies of water of St. Louis County, Minnesota